The 2021 Wirral Metropolitan Borough Council election took place on 6 May 2021 to elect members of Wirral Metropolitan Borough Council in England. This election was held on the same day as other local elections. The election was originally due to take place in May 2020, but was postponed due to the COVID-19 pandemic. This delay meant those elected (excluding the by-election) would serve only a three-year term.

After the election, the composition of the council was:

Election results

Overall election result

Overall result compared with 2019.

Changes in council composition

Prior to the election the composition of the council was:

After the election the composition of the council was:

Parties and candidates

Contesting political parties

2020 Candidate selection
In August 2019, incumbent Labour councillor for Prenton Tony Norbury was not approved for candidacy by the Local campaign forum thus was unable to seek re-selection. Former Prenton councillor Angie Davies, who lost her seat in May to the Green's Chris Cooke, was selected as the new Labour candidate in October. The Greens are fielding Harry Gorman who was selected in June.

Tom Usher, then youngest member of council and cabinet member for Children and Families, lost a selection contest in his Liscard Labour branch in October to Dave Brennan by 21 votes to 30. This was criticised by Independent group leader, and former Labour councillor, Moira McLaughlin who perceived Usher as having been "booted out by the hard-left". Liscard labour chair Edwina Doyle dismissed this notion putting the result down to Usher being "a bit younger and less experienced [than Brennan]". In January 2020, he was selected to contest the neighboring, Conservative held, ward of Wallasey.

Conservative councillor Chris Blakeley died of cancer on 15 January. A casual vacancy was announced on 6 February with the seat to be filled at the upcoming election when Blakeley's term was due to end. Simon Mountney, who had served alongside Blakeley as a fellow ward councillor from 2004 to 2014, was selected as the Conservative candidate in March. Though he was replaced by Max Booth the following January after the elections had been rescheduled. Mountney was later selected to contest the West Kirby and Thurstaston ward.

The Conservatives posted an appeal for candidates on Twitter on 17 February for wards in the Wallasey and Birkenhead constituencies.

2021 Candidate selection

Chase Newton was selected as the Lib Dem candidate for Bromborough on 23 July 2020 succeeding Vicky Downie who stood down due to personal reasons. Downie had been the party's candidate in the ward for the previous three elections.

Former Labour Councillor Bill Davies resigned his seat in September with a casual vacancy announced on the 7th.

Conservative councillor Geoffrey Watt died on 24 September 2020 after a short illness.

Campaign

On 24 February, Leader of the Council Pat Hackett announced he was standing down as both leader and councillor for New Brighton later in the year. This was, however, to be in July after the election was scheduled. Hackett was succeeded as Leader of the Labour Group by his deputy Janette Williamson on 29 June 2020. She was voted in as Leader of the Council in a virtual meeting on 28 September. Hackett later resigned his seat in September.

A leaked internal Labour report released on 3 March 2020 predicted severe losses for the party at the upcoming local elections across the country. Wirral, however, was one of only two authorities (the other being Burnley) seen as a possible gain for Labour with Wirral being the only positive prediction under all models used within the report.

On 13 March it was announced that all elections due to be held in May would be suspended until the following year due to the COVID-19 pandemic.

An e-newsletter created by the Oxton Labour Party revealed that it and the rest of the Birkenhead constituency party were not delivering leaflets due to the ongoing COVID-19 pandemic.

Leader of the Conservative group Ian Lewis resigned on 15 December 2020 citing internal party problems. Lewis's predecessor Jeff Green was elected leader on 22 December beating controversial Greasby, Frankby and Irby councillor David Burgess-Joyce.

Retiring councillors

Ward results
Results compared directly with the last local election in 2019.

Bebington

Bidston and St James

Birkenhead and Tranmere

Bromborough

Clatterbridge

Claughton

Eastham

Greasby, Frankby and Irby

Heswall

Hoylake and Meols

Leasowe and Moreton East

Liscard

Moreton West and Saughall Massie

New Brighton

Oxton

Pensby and Thingwall

Prenton

Rock Ferry

Seacombe

Upton

Wallasey

West Kirby and Thurstaston

Changes between 2021 and 2022

Liscard by-election 2021

Cllr Sarah Spoor, first elected in 2018, announced her resignation on 4 June 2021. A casual vacancy was announced on the 7th.

Oxton by-election 2021

Cllr Andy Corkhill, first elected in 2019, died of cancer at the age of 36 on 4 October 2021. A casual vacancy was announced on the 20th.

Other changes

See also
 2021 Liverpool City Region mayoral election
 2021 Merseyside police and crime commissioner election

Notes
• italics denote the sitting councillor • bold denotes the winning candidate

References

Wirral Metropolitan Borough Council election
2020
2020s in Merseyside